Ulf-Diether Soyka (born 5 June 1954) is an Austrian composer, conductor and lecturer.

Musical creation and compositional style 

Soyka was born in Vienna, Austria.  He prefers to write music for the concert hall, for orchestra, chamber music, choral works and operas.  His compositional style was described by Dr. Werner Pelinka in 1987 in the cultural magazine morgen:

Soyka also investigated connections between chromatic and micro-interval music. Since 2007 he brought out his publication about micro interval composition theory. In 2012 he also brought out his (very melodic) opera Ninja, in which micro-tonality is assigned mainly to one of the principal characters, the Robot Androido, in order to underline the “emotions” of this character adequately.

Selected compositions 

 Operas, e.g. "Leyla" (premiered 2003 in the Künstlerhaus Wien), „Terpsichore“, „Ninja“ (premiered 2003 in Birmingham, England) among others 
 Ballet music (e.g. "Das Idol", premiered 1990 in the Stadttheater Klagenfurt) 
 three piano concertos (1st: CD with Alma Sauer and Oliver v. Dohnanyi 1987, 2nd: premiere in the Philharmonie Baku, Azerbaijan 1993, soloist: Rena Rzaeva, conductor: Rauf Abdullaev, 3rd:premiere 2012, Vienna, soloist: Hemma Tuppy, conductor: U.-D. Soyka) 
 Cello concerto (premiered by Mark Varshavsky) 
 Horn concerto (for James Lowe, Birmingham 2004) 
 Symphonies (the first premiered 2006 in Bulgaria, conductor: Grigor Palikarov; the second premiered 2014 in Vienna, conductor: Thomas Payne) 
 Masses, Oratories (e.g. Requiem with Consolation, Pfingst-Oratory and others) 
 Choir works 
 Song cycles 
 Chamber music 
 Micro-tonal chamber music (SIMC-Konzert with H.-A. Stamm's  enharmonic micro-tonal Organ etc.)

List of works 

Soykas work list includes the following work groups:

 op. 1 Masses, oratorios, religious music;
 op. 2 Chamber music for smaller ensembles;
 op. 3 larger chamber ensembles;
 op. 4 String/Chamber orchestra;
 op. 5 Instrumental concertos;
 op. 6 Song;
 op. 7 Film, Dance, Entertainment music and Audio art;
 op. 8 School music;
 op. 9 Keyboard instruments solo;
 op. 10 Orchestra;
 op. 11 Choir;
 op. 12: Operas;

Conductors activities 

Ulf-Diether Soyka prefers conducting his own works. He has conducted at

 Konzerthaus Vienna (R.Strauss, Pro Arte-Orchester)
 ORF-Hall Vienna (J.N.David, Pro Arte-Orchester)
 Großer Musikvereinssaal Vienna (Goldener Saal) (U.-D.Soyka, 2. Saxophone Concerto Nr. 2, premiere with the  NÖ.Tonkünstlerorchester)
 Austrian Music Days in Bulgaria 2001 - 2003 (Suite for String orchestra, premiere with the Opera Philharmonic Orchestra Plovdiv)
 Repertoire: W.A.Mozart, J.Haydn, L.van Beethoven, F.Schubert, J.Brahms …
 World premieres of works of composers who had to leave Germany in 1938.

Education 

Soyka completed his diploma studies with Friedrich Cerha (composition) and Otmar Suitner (orchestral conducting) as well as the teaching profession for musical education at the University for Music and Performing Arts in Vienna.

Awards 

 1975 and 1977 scholar of the Alban-Berg-Foundation
 1980 and 1987 Theodor-Körner-Composition award
 1981 scholar of City of Vienna for composition
 1983 Austrian State grant for composition
 1983 Support prize for music in Lower Austria 
 1985 Culture prize in Klosterneuburg
 1985 Composer's prize in Tolima/Columbia
 2002 Composer's prize for choir music to texts from Wilhelm Busch
 2008 AICE culture composer's prize for choir music

Functions in the music life 

1979- 1981 teaching representatives at the University for Music and Dramatical Art in Vienna, 1982-1983 high school-teacher, 1983 Austrian state scholar for composition. He then worked as a freelance composer and occasional conductor. Soyka wrote numerous commissioned compositions within the next years, and since 2000 he has been working as an assistant professor of Music Theory and Composition at the Prayner Conservatory in Vienna.
  
Further long-term functions: High school teacher, leader of a church choir, member of the executive board in the Austrian composer federation, subject lectures at English and Australian Music-Universities, music journalism for many cultural journals (Ö.Musikzeitschrift u.a.), management of music symposia, functions in AKM, ÖGZM, music labour union etc., expert of the Viennese summer seminars for new music, founder and manager of an ensemble for new music, coordination of the “Pro-Arte-Orchestra”, founder and concert organiser of „Project First Performances“, lecturer at the intercultural Ekmelik Symposium Salzburg 1986, and much more.

Family 

Soyka has three grown sons.

References

External links 
 
http://www.konservatorium-prayner.at/index.php?lang=EN
http://www.stadttheater-klagenfurt.at/de/
http://www.hofburgkapelle.at/content/hofmusikkapelle/
http://www.mdw.ac.at/stdi/?PageId=1334

Austrian male composers
Austrian composers
Male conductors (music)
Living people
1954 births
21st-century Austrian conductors (music)
21st-century male musicians